Andreyevka is a rural locality (a village) in Nikolayevsky Selsoviet, Blagoveshchensky District, Bashkortostan, Russia. The population was 33 as of 2010. There are 7 streets.

Geography 
Andreyevka is located 19 km northeast of Blagoveshchensk (the district's administrative centre) by road. Kurech is the nearest rural locality.

References 

Rural localities in Blagoveshchensky District